Giovanni Magnani (fl. 1913) was a Romanian-Italian entrepreneur who lived in Bucharest at the beginning of the 20th century. In 1911 he fabricated a set of propellers for A Vlaicu II airplane, thus becoming the first propeller manufacturer in Southeast Europe.

Before meeting Vlaicu, Magnani built around 1910 in Bucharest an ornithopter that never flew.

See also
 Aurel Vlaicu
 A Vlaicu II
 Husqvarna Motorcycles

References

Engineers from Bucharest
Businesspeople from Bucharest
20th-century Romanian people